Nori is the Japanese name for various edible seaweed species.

Nori may also refer to:

People with the given name
 Nór or Nori, the legendary first king of Norway
 Nori Aoki (born 1982), Japanese baseball outfielder
 Nori Shiraishi (born 1986), Japanese producer, model, singer and songwriter
 Nori Dalisay (born 1938), Filipina actress
 Nori (Middle-earth), a character in The Hobbit
 Nori, a character in Barbie: Mermaidia

People with the surname
 Andrew Nori (1952–2013), Solomon Islands lawyer and politician
 Dattatreyudu Nori, Indian radiation oncologist
 Francesco Nori (1565–1631), Roman Catholic prelate 
 Greig Nori (born 1974), Canadian producer and musician
 Mpok Nori (1930–2015), Indonesian comedian and actress 
 Sandra Nori (born 1953), retired Australian politician

Other uses

 Accrington brick or Nori, a type of engineering brick

 NORI, the Nuclear Medicine, Oncology and Radiotherapy Institute in Pakistan
 Nori, the Ngarrindjeri word for the Australian pelican
Nori (company), carbon removal company in the United States

 Nori language (Papuan)

 Nori language (Colombia)
 Norry or nori, an improvised rail vehicle from Cambodia

See also
 Noorie, a 1979 Hindi romance film